Melinda "La Maravilla" Cooper (born March 6, 1985, in Las Vegas, Nevada), was the WIBA and IBA Flyweight Champion of the world, and is recognized as one of the elite female professional boxers on the planet.

Cooper started boxing in 1996, after meeting trainer James Pena at the Nevada Partners gym in Las Vegas.
Pena recalls that at first he did not realize that Cooper was a girl, because she was with three boys and the hood of her coat was over her head. "There were a group of kids there, and I asked them all if they wanted to box, but no one really wanted to. 
Then I asked Melinda, 'How about you?' and she said she'd try it. It wasn't until the next day I realized she was a girl."
"I told her, `Oh, sweetheart, I can't let you box. You're a girl. 
I can't let you box with the boys.' But she said she wanted to try and box them."
She lasted four rounds that first day, and made an impression on Pena, who had never trained a female before. "I told her, `If you want to box, show up at 3:30 and don't be late. Every day since, she's showed up at 3:30." Pena later became Cooper's legal guardian.

Cooper went on to compile a depth of ring experience as an amateur boxer, quite rare for a female fighter, racking up an amateur record of 37–2, and numerous national amateur championships.

When she turned pro, she made history by becoming the first female boxer under the age of 18 to be licensed in the state of Nevada. The move was seen as necessary, because it was becoming increasingly difficult to find amateurs willing to fight Cooper. 
Pena said he would try to enter Cooper in tournaments at the last minute to keep her a secret, because "girls would find out that Melinda was in a tournament's weight class and everyone would drop out."

Cooper began her professional boxing career at age 17 on March 23, 2002, in Las Vegas, Nevada, winning a four-round unanimous decision over Annalisa Middleton.

In July 2004, Cooper won a 6-round unanimous decision to Johanna Peña-Álvarez.

Cooper has beaten every opponent she has faced as a professional, and on January 14, 2005, in Rancho Mirage, California, she TKO'd Anissa Zamarron in the ninth round to win the vacant IBA and WIBA Flyweight World Titles.

Currently, Cooper has a professional record of 20–0 with 11 KOs.

In addition to her impressive boxing resume, Cooper has also been featured in several nationally recognized magazines including Girls Life, Teen and World Boxing. 
Her personality and striking good looks are leading to experiences and endorsement opportunities beyond the sport she does so well.

"What makes Melinda appealing both inside and outside the ring is that she's real", says James Pena. "There is nothing fake about her; there are no masks. What you see is what you get. Melinda has the least amount of ego of anyone I know." 
"Don't get me wrong, she does have pride and that's what she protects when she gets in the ring. But as far as her perception of herself and how she treats everyone around her, that's her best asset and it doesn't have anything to do with boxing."

Professional boxing record

References

1985 births
Living people
American women boxers
Boxers from Nevada
Sportspeople from Las Vegas
Super-bantamweight boxers